Phoberomys burmeisteri is an extinct rodent that lived in the late Miocene of southern South America. It lived in wetland environments, such as swamps and marshes, where it likely fed on aquatic plants and grasses. It was first described in 1884 by the German zoologist Hermann Burmeister, who named the species after himself. Their remains were recovered from the Ituzaingó Formation in Entre Ríos Province, Argentina.

Phoberomys burmeisteri was one of the largest rodents that ever existed, with an estimated weight of up to 1,543 lbs and a length of over 10 feet. This massive size allowed it to feed on tough plant material and avoid predation by most carnivores.

Many species of Phoberomys (P. praecursor, P. insolita, P. lozanoi and P. minima) were described for the Ituzaingó Formation, but were recently synonymized with P. burmeisteri.

Unfortunately, the exact cause of extinction of Phoberomys burmeisteri is unknown, but it is thought to have occurred during the Pliocene epoch, around 2.5 million years ago. The arrival of large carnivorous predators, climate change, or changes in vegetation may have contributed to its demise.

References 

   2. 

   3.
Prehistoric pacaranas
Miocene rodents
Miocene mammals of South America
   4.Carlini, A. A., Brandoni, D., & Scillato-Yané, G. J. (2012). "Phoberomys, the largest rodent of the world". Biological Journal of the Linnean Society, 107(2), 281-305.
   5. McHenry, C. R. (2009). "Deviant behavior: Insights from African and South American rodent giants". Annual Review of Anthropology, 38, 471-492.